The 2008 season was the 13th season of New York Red Bulls's franchise existence. They played their home games at Giants Stadium in East Rutherford, New Jersey. Juan Carlos Osorio made his debut as the Red Bulls coach after being hired in December 2007.

Statistics

Appearances and goals
Last updated on August 19, 2008.

|}

Disciplinary record
 Disciplinary records for 2008 league matches. Players with 1 card or more included only.

Pre-season

Carolina Challenge Cup

MLS season

U.S. Open Cup

Mid-season friendlies

MLS Playoffs

MLS Cup

See also
2008 Major League Soccer season

References

New
New York Red Bulls seasons
Red bulls